Maesa is a genus of flowering plants. It is placed in the family Primulaceae, subfamily Maesoideae, for which it is the sole genus (monotypic). Previously it was placed in Myrsinaceae, or in a family of its own, Maesaceae. There are about 100 species, the majority of which occur in Malesia, New Guinea, western Asia and the Pacific Islands.

These plants are vines, shrubs, and trees up to 12 meters tall.

Species include:

 Maesa alnifolia
 Maesa angolensis
 Maesa bequaertii
 Maesa borjeana
 Maesa butaguensis
 Maesa cordifolia
 Maesa djalonis
 Maesa emirnensis 
 Maesa indica
 Maesa japonica
 Maesa kamerunensis
 Maesa kivuensis
 Maesa lanceolata
 Maesa macrocarpa
 Maesa mildbraedii
 Maesa nuda
 Maesa palustris
 Maesa picta
 Maesa rufescens
 Maesa rufo-velutina
 Maesa ruwenzoriensis
 Maesa schweinfurthii
 Maesa serrato-dentata
 Maesa tabacifolia
 Maesa velutina
 Maesa vestita
 Maesa welwitschii

References

 
Taxonomy articles created by Polbot
Primulaceae genera